Spider-Man's wedding at Shea Stadium in 1987 was a publicity stunt and live performance adaptation of the comic book storyline "The Wedding!" produced by Marvel Comics. The event was meant to advertise the special issue of The Amazing Spider-Man comic book, which went on sale the next Tuesday and took place at home plate in front of more than 45,000 fans just before the New York Mets played the Pittsburgh Pirates.

Production
Mary Jane Watson's dress was designed by Willi Smith and was his last project before his death.

Event
The show follows the comic book story and has Stan Lee officiating it.

Reception
Andy L. Kubai of Looper stated that he originally believed that Marvel held the ceremony at Shea Stadium because they couldn't afford something larger like Yankee Stadium but believed it made more sense after he learned that the character Peter Parker is a Mets fan. Gary Smith of Comic Book Resources stated that he believed that the wedding at Shea Stadium was Marvel's third greatest publicity stunt and that Stan Lee's part was very appropriate.

Cast and characters
 Mary Jane Watson - Tara Shannon
 Spider-Man/Peter Parker
 Hulk
 Captain America
 Ice-Man
 Fire-Star
 Green Goblin
 Dr. Doom

See also
 Spider-Man Live!
 Marvel Universe Live!

References

External links
 To Thee I Web, Part I: Idol Banter

Spider-Man in live performances
1987 in theatre
Publicity stunts
1987 Major League Baseball season
1987 in sports in New York City
New York Mets